This is the complete list of Commonwealth Games medallists in rowing from 1930 to 1986.

Men's

Single sculls

Double sculls

Coxless pairs

Coxless fours

Coxed fours

Eights

Lightweight single sculls

Lightweight coxless fours

Women's

Single sculls

Double sculls

Coxless pairs

Coxed fours

Eights

Lightweight single sculls

Lightweight coxless fours

References
Results Database from the Commonwealth Games Federation

Rowing
Medalists

Commonw